The 1992 New England Patriots season was the team’s 33rd season overall and 23rd in the National Football League. It was the team’s second year with Dick MacPherson as head coach, but the team had its third owner in the last five seasons. Businessman Victor Kiam, who had purchased the team from its founders, the Sullivan family, in 1988, sold the team to advertising executive and Anheuser-Busch scion James Orthwein in the 1991-92 offseason. Rumours Orthwein planned to move the Patriots from Foxborough were denied.

The Patriots were looking to improve on their 6–10 record from the year before but instead regressed back to a 2–14 record, being affected by serious knee damage to mainstay offensive tackle Bruce Armstrong that caused him to miss the second half of the season. However, an inept running game that did not score a rushing touchdown until the eleventh game was the primary cause of the Patriots’ bad record. They finished last in the AFC East and their record tied the Seattle Seahawks for the worst mark in the entire league. However, the Patriots finished dead last in the NFL because of their Week 3 loss to the Seahawks. The Patriots thus received the first pick in the subsequent draft.

Following the season, wholesale changes were made. MacPherson and his staff were fired and Bill Parcells, who had last coached the New York Giants to victory in Super Bowl XXV, was brought in as his replacement. The 1992 team was also the last to play in the colors that the Patriots had played in since their founding, as the team adopted a new logo and a blue, silver, and red color scheme.

Offseason

1992 NFL Draft

Staff

Roster

Regular season

Schedule

Standings

See also 
 List of New England Patriots seasons

External links

References 

New England Patriots
New England Patriots seasons
New England Patriots
Sports competitions in Foxborough, Massachusetts